Langenlonsheim is a former Verbandsgemeinde ("collective municipality") in the district of Bad Kreuznach, Rhineland-Palatinate, Germany. The seat of the Verbandsgemeinde was in Langenlonsheim. On 1 January 2020 it was merged into the new Verbandsgemeinde Langenlonsheim-Stromberg.

The Verbandsgemeinde Langenlonsheim consisted of the following Ortsgemeinden ("local municipalities"):

 Bretzenheim
 Dorsheim
 Guldental
 Langenlonsheim
 Laubenheim
 Rümmelsheim
 Windesheim

Former Verbandsgemeinden in Rhineland-Palatinate